Seftia Hadi (born on 26 September 1991), is an Indonesian former footballer who plays as a centre-back or left-back. He also has a curling free kick ability although he is a defender.

Honours

Club honors
Sriwijaya
Indonesia Super League (1): 2011–12

Country honors
Indonesia U-23
Southeast Asian Games Silver Medal (1): 2011
Islamic Solidarity Games Silver Medal (1): 2013

International goals
Seftia Hadi: International under-23 goals

References

External links
Profile at kanalbola.com
Profile at Tribuna

Indonesian footballers
1991 births
Living people
People from Deli Serdang Regency
Sportspeople from North Sumatra
Indonesia youth international footballers
PSMS Medan players
PSPS Pekanbaru players
Sriwijaya F.C. players
Mitra Kukar players
Semen Padang F.C. players
Liga 1 (Indonesia) players
Association football defenders
Southeast Asian Games silver medalists for Indonesia
Southeast Asian Games medalists in football
Competitors at the 2011 Southeast Asian Games
21st-century Indonesian people